Monetary policy pertains to the regulation, availability, and cost of credit, while Fiscal policy deals with government expenditures, taxes, and debt. Through management of these areas, the Ministry of Finance regulated the allocation of resources in the economy, affected the distribution of income and wealth among the citizenry, stabilized the level of economic activities, and promoted economic growth and welfare.

The Ministry of Finance played an important role in Japan's postwar economic growth. It advocated a "growth first" approach, with a high proportion of government spending going to capital accumulation, and minimum government spending overall, which kept both taxes and deficit spending down, making more money available for private investment. Most Japanese put money into savings accounts, mostly postal savings.

Budget process
The Budget Bureau of the Ministry of Finance is at the heart of the political process because it draws up the national budget each year. This responsibility makes it the ultimate focus of interest groups and of other ministries that compete for limited funds. The budgetary process generally begins soon after the start of a new fiscal year on April 1. Ministries and government agencies prepare budget requests in consultation with the Policy Research Council.

In the fall of each year, Budget Bureau examiners reviews these requests in great detail, while top Ministry of Finance officials work out the general contours of the new budget and the distribution of tax revenues. During the winter, after the release of the ministry's draft budget, campaigning by individual Diet members for their constituents and different ministries for revisions and supplementary allocations becomes intense. The coalition leaders and Ministry of Finance officials consult on a final draft budget, which is generally passed by the Diet in late winter.

In broad outline, the process reveals a basic characteristic of Japanese political dynamics: that despite the oft-stated ideals of "harmony" and "consensus," interests, including bureaucratic interests, are in strong competition for resources. Political leaders and Budget Bureau officials need great skill to reach mutually acceptable compromises. The image of "Japan Incorporated," in which harmony and unanimity are virtually automatic, belies the reality of intense rivalry. The late-twentieth-century system is successful insofar as political skills and appreciation of common interests minimize antagonisms and maintain a balance of power among groups. It is unclear, however, whether this system will continue as Japan faces such problems as growing social inequality and an aging society.

National debt 

In 2011 Japan's public debt was about 230 percent of its annual gross domestic product, the largest percentage of any nation in the world.

In order to address the Japanese budget gap and growing national debt, in June 2012 the Japanese Diet passed a bill to double the national consumption tax to 10%. The new bill increases the tax to 8% by April 2014 and 10% by October 2015.  However, it was delayed until at least October 2019.

See also
Defense budget of Japan
Ministry of Finance (Japan)
Bank of Japan

References

  - Japan

External links
Bank of Japan's (BOJ) - Bank Rate since 1985 (on a monthly basis)
The Japan Tax Site - Japanese fiscal policy and Japanese tax issues

Politics of Japan
Finance in Japan
Fiscal policy
Japan